WUNC may refer to:

 WUNC (FM), a radio station (91.5 FM) licensed to Chapel Hill, North Carolina, United States
 WUNC-TV, a television station (channel 4 analog/25 digital) licensed to Chapel Hill, North Carolina